is a railway station in located in the city of Yokkaichi,  Mie Prefecture, Japan, operated by the private railway operator Kintetsu Railway. It also has a freight depot operated by the Japan Freight Railway Company (JR Freight).

Lines
Shiohama Station is served by the Nagoya Line, and is located 40.8 rail kilometers from the starting point of the line at Kintetsu Nagoya Station. Freight operations use the Kansai Main Line freight branch.

Station layout
The station consists of two island platforms serving four tracks, connected by an elevated concourse.

Platforms

Adjacent stations

History
Shiohama Station opened on October 25, 1919 as a station on the Ise Railway. The Ise Railway became the Sangu Express Electric Railway's Ise Line on September 15, 1936, and was renamed the Nagoya Line on December 7, 1938. After merging with Osaka Electric Kido on March 15, 1941, the line became the Kansai Express Railway's Nagoya Line. This line was merged with the Nankai Electric Railway on June 1, 1944 to form Kintetsu. A new station building was completed on June 23, 1986.

The freight terminal was opened as part of the Japanese Government Railways freight operations on June 1, 1944, subsequently part of the Japanese National Railways (JNR). Containerized freight operations were handled from April 1, 1962 to July 1, 1975. With the privatization and dissolution of the JNR on April 1, 1987, operation of the freight terminal came under the Japan Freight Railway Company, which resumed container operations from June 20, 1988 to March 16, 1996.

Passenger statistics
In fiscal 2019, the station was used by an average of 3468 passengers daily (boarding passengers only).

Surrounding area
Minami-Yokkaichi Station (JR Central Kansai Main Line)
Japan National Route 23
Yokkaichi City Shiohama Elementary School
Yokkaichi City Shiohama Junior High Schoolt

See also
List of railway stations in Japan

References

External links

  

Railway stations in Japan opened in 1919
Railway stations in Mie Prefecture
Stations of Kintetsu Railway
Stations of Japan Freight Railway Company
Yokkaichi